Sulphur Bluff is an unincorporated community in northeastern Hopkins County, Texas, United States.

Hopkins County used to be the dairy capital until recently.
The Sulphur Bluff Independent School District serves area students. 

Its population was approximately 280 in 1990.

References

External links

Unincorporated communities in Hopkins County, Texas
Unincorporated communities in Texas